Saphenista brunneomaculata is a species of moth of the family Tortricidae. It is found in Pichincha Province, Ecuador.

The wingspan is about 18 mm. The ground colour of the forewings is cream, slightly tinged with olive brownish and with brownish suffusions and brown dots. The hindwings are brownish cream.

Etymology
The species name refers to the brown maculation of the forewings and is derived from Latin brunneus (meaning brown).

References

Moths described in 2008
Saphenista